Main Gunehgar Nahi is a 2013 Urdu language Pakistani television series, aired on Ary Digital. Mawra Hocane and Sami Khan played the leading roles, while Shamoon Abbasi and Faizan Khawaja also played pivotal roles. Main Gunehgar Nahi has 21 episodes and was a commercial success.

The show was also telecast in India on Zindagi from 25 March 2015 under the title "Ladki Hona Gunaah Nahin" Mon - Sat 10:30 pm.

Plot

Main Gunehgar Nahi is the tragic portrayal of a male-dominated society and its double standards.  A young woman named Ammara, (Mawra Hocane), has her world turns upside down after she is the victim of a barbarous crime. She is treated as a culprit and made to feel ashamed even though she is not guilty of anything. The people she trusts turn away from her.

Ammara is engaged to her neighbor Faizan, (Sami Khan).  Faizan said he will never leave Ammara, but when she is raped by three men, (the sons of rich men amusing themselves), Faizan breaks their engagement which causes her to lose all trust and hope. Everyone treats her as a criminal. She marries Zubair, (Shamoon Abbasi), who only wants her for her money.  The same day, Faizan marries Maira, who is in love with another man. In contrast, Ammara does everything for Zubair's happiness, but he treats her badly. Everyone wants to use Ammara for her money, except Zubair's brother, Talha (Danish Ali), who treats her like a sister.

One day,  Zubair takes Ammara to a party. After enticing her to dress seductively, his real intent is revealed; he sells her for a business deal, but Ammara escapes before anything is done. She realizes that she hasn't done anything wrong and wonders why the world treats her as if she is a sinner.  After leaving the party, she meets Zaid (Faizan Khawaja). Zaid helps her by giving her a ride home and bringing back her trust in men. Eventually, the two become friends.

Ammara asks Zubair to give her divorce, but Zubair doesn't take it seriously since he sees Ammara as a weak woman who can't survive without him. She becomes a strong woman, he gives her a divorce and afterwards, she moves back to her father's house. Jumshaid's wife demands that they move, as she doesn't want her daughters to live with Ammara.  Jumshaid moves his family to a new home but isn't happy with his wife's decision.

Faizan, his mother and sister leave for a family wedding. His wife, Maira, stays home and calls Abbas after everyone has left.  A minor accident on the way to the wedding causes the family to come home early, catching Maira and Abbas together.  Faizan divorces Maira.  This makes him realize how badly he treated Ammara and how much he misses her. He sends his mother, who hadn't treated Ammara any better, to Ammara's house with a proposal of marriage. Jumshaid gets angry and rejects Faizan's proposal.

Zubair goes to Zaid, who turns out to be a journalist, to tell him about Ammara's rape scandal, asking for it to be published as "chatpati" news in the newspaper.  Zaid refuses, angrily, and throws Zubair out.  Zubair discovers he is dying of liver cancer. When Ammara finds out, she gives 10 lakhs to Zubair's parents for his treatment. On his deathbed, Zubair asks his father to go to Ammara and apologize to her then dies. When his father goes to Ammara's house, he returns her money and apologizes; She forgives everyone.

The three men who raped Ammara make a plan to rob Jumshaid's house. Before the robbery, they go to a restaurant where Ammara , while dining with Zaid,  recognizes them. She informs Zaid about who they are causing Zaid to want to fight them, but Ammara stops him, saying "humain sabit qadam rehna chahiye warna inhe shuk ho jaye ga,Ye jab dakaiti kar rhe hongay tau inhe rangay hathoon pakarwain gay".  Instead he calls his friend, a senior rank of police, to send his team of police to follow the men.

The men go to Jamshaid's house, planning to rape his wife, but police arrive and arrest them before they can. When she learns she was saved because of Ammara, she feels full of regret. Ammara is nominated for 10 fashion designers awards. She gives Zaid an interview for his newspaper with the title "Main Gunehgar Nahin". With Zaid's urging, Ammara agrees to marry Faizan however when he learns they're engaged, he  realizes how much he loves her unaware that Ammara also loves him very much. She asks Faizan to go to Zaid; he says that "jao main ne pehle bhi tumhain boht taqleef Di hai afar tum Zaid k sath khush ho tau jao ghar waloon ko mn samjha loonga". She confesses her love to Zaid and they get married.

Cast 

Mawra Hocane as Ammara 
Sami Khan as Faizan (Ammara's fiancé)
Shamoon Abbasi as Zubair
Faizan Khawaja as Zaid
Danish Ali as Talha
Hira Pervaiz as Myra (Faizan's wife)
Farooq Zameer as Ammara's Father
Salahuddin Tunio as Ammara's father-in-law
Amsa Ali
Binita Marshal

References 

ARY Digital original programming
Zee Zindagi original programming